Filson may refer to:

Filson (company), an outdoor clothing maker in Seattle, Washington
Filson, Illinois
Filson Nunatak, Antarctica
The Filson Historical Society, in Louisville, Kentucky, formerly the Filson Club
People with the name:
Filson Young (1876–1938), journalist
John Filson (1747–1788), Kentucky explorer
Pete Filson (born 1958), Major League Baseball pitcher
Rex Bertram Filson (born 1930), Australian lichenologist